William Charles Gaudin (24 May 1874 – 31 August 1921) was a professional golfer from Jersey. Gaudin had four younger brothers who were also professional golfers, Jack, Phil, Ernest and Herbert.

Golf career
Gaudin was an assistant to Tom Vardon at Ilkley Golf Club in the mid-1890s and was also a frequent playing companion of Harry Vardon, Tom's brother.  When he played in the 1897 Open Championship his club is given as Doncaster. In 1899 he was the professional at Bradford Golf Club when it moved from Baildon to Hawksworth. In 1903 he moved from Bradford to the new Scarborough Town Club (now Scarborough South Cliff) with his assistant Bertie Snowball. In 1905 Gaudin and Snowball moved to Royal Portrush Golf Club but the appointment was short-lived since Gaudin emigrated later the same year.

Gaudin arrived in New York City in late 1905 and became the professional at Dutchess Golf Club near Poughkeepsie, New York, for 1906. He played in the 1907 U.S. Open at the Philadelphia Cricket Club and was tied for 30th place.

Death
Gaudin died of tuberculosis in a New York City sanatorium in August 1921 aged 47 leaving a wife and five children.

Results in major championships

Note: Gaudin only played in The Open Championship and the U.S. Open.

CUT = missed the cut
WD = withdrew
"T" indicates a tie for a place

References

Jersey male golfers
People from Grouville
Tuberculosis deaths in New York (state)
20th-century deaths from tuberculosis
1874 births
1921 deaths